Luiz Rogério Lima Arapiraca (born 26 December 1987 in Feira de Santana) is a Brazilian competitive swimmer.

Arapicara won the gold medal in the 1500-metre freestyle and the bronze medal in the 400-metre freestyle Juvenile B, at the 2005 South American Youth Championships.

At the 2006 South American Games, he won the gold medal in the 800-metre freestyle, in the 1500-metre freestyle, and bronze in the 4×200-metre freestyle

Arapiraca competed at the 2007 Pan American Games, in Rio de Janeiro, where he went to the 1500-metre freestyle final, finishing in fifth place.

In 2009, at the Maria Lenk Aquatic Center, Arapiraca distinguished himself by breaking two old Brazilian swimming records: Luiz Lima's 1500-metre freestyle record, that existed 11 years ago, and Djan Madruga's 800-metre freestyle record, which lingered since 1980, and finally fell after 29 years.

At the 2009 Jose Finkel Trophy, he broke the South American record of Venezuelan Ricardo Monasterio, 15:15.05, with a time of 15:13.13.

He was at the 2010 South American Games, where he earned the gold medal in the 1500-metre freestyle, and silver in the 800-metre freestyle

He was at the 2010 Pan Pacific Swimming Championships in Irvine, where he finished 20th in the 800-metre freestyle, and 17th in the 1500-metre freestyle.

On 3 May 2011, Arapiraca broke again the South American record of the 1500-metre freestyle, with a time of 15:12.69.

At the 2011 Pan American Games, he finished 13th in the 1500-metre freestyle.

In 2012, Arapiraca became the champion of the Travessia dos Fortes. He had already won the race in 2010.

Arapiraca classified to participate in the 5 km marathon swimming at the 2013 World Aquatics Championships in Barcelona. He finished 30th in the race.

References

1987 births
Living people
People from Feira de Santana
Swimmers at the 2007 Pan American Games
Swimmers at the 2011 Pan American Games
South American Games gold medalists for Brazil
South American Games silver medalists for Brazil
South American Games bronze medalists for Brazil
South American Games medalists in swimming
Competitors at the 2006 South American Games
Competitors at the 2010 South American Games
Pan American Games competitors for Brazil
Brazilian male freestyle swimmers
Sportspeople from Bahia
20th-century Brazilian people
21st-century Brazilian people